The 1905 German football championship was the third time clubs in Germany competed for the national title under the auspices of the German Football Association (DFB). There were eleven entries into the competition, marking a new record. For the first time, the holders were given an automatic spot in the competition, taken by VfB Leipzig who had won the 1903 German football championship and had reached the final in the year before, when the competition was annulled.

The large number of participants and the differences in strength persuaded the DFB to hold preliminary rounds before the quarterfinals. However, the dire financial situation of Schlesien Breslau and VfB Leipzig led to those two teams not travelling to their matches.  New matches were scheduled, making for a confusing schedule and semifinals with only three teams.

Both finalists appeared for the first time with Union 92 Berlin winning their only national title.

Qualified teams
The qualified teams:

Competition

First qualifying round

Second qualifying round

Breslau did not travel to Leipzig, citing financial reasons. Magdeburg were then scheduled to play Eintracht Braunschweig instead.

Third qualifying round

Quarter-finals

VfB Leipzig did not travel to the match citing financial reasons. Braunschweig were instead scheduled to play Union 92 Berlin who had originally received a bye to the semifinals.

Semi-finals

Karlsruher FV received a bye to the final.

Final

References

German football championship seasons
1
German